Arie Wouter Heijkoop (26 August 1883, in Charlois – 13 December 1929, in Rotterdam) was a Dutch politician who served in the House of Representatives from 1918 to 1919. He was also a municipal councillor in Rotterdam from 1923 to 1929.

References

1883 births
1929 deaths
Members of the House of Representatives (Netherlands)
Municipal councillors of Rotterdam
Social Democratic Workers' Party (Netherlands) politicians